The Omega China Tour was a China-based men's professional golf tour that ran from 2004 to 2009.

The tour was created to encourage the development players who intended to move up to the Asian Tour or other major international tours, and also to help accelerate the development of golf in the People's Republic of China, following the sports reintroduction to the country in the 1980s, having been absent during the early communist era.

Launched by the China Golf Association in 2005, the tour began with four three-day tournaments, each with a minimum purse of US$100,000. This increased to six four-day tournaments in 2006, and then eight in 2007. It was initially planned to have ten tournaments in 2008, but this was not possible, and there were again eight events. There were four events in 2009 after which the tour folded.

China has hosted some big-money European Tour sanctioned tournaments, but at the launch of the Omega China Tour, the executive vice-president of the China Golf Association Jiang Xiuyun commented, "The future for golf in China – the real, long-term future – is not paying large sums to bring the world's superstars to play here. It is creating our own stars". The Singapore-based World Sports Group was granted a five-year contract to organise the events.

Order of Merit winners

References

Golf in China
Professional golf tours